College of Human Ecology is the name of several colleges at various universities dealing with the study of human ecology:

Asia
 College of Human Ecology at Chungnam National University
 College of Human Ecology at Dong-A University
 College of Human Ecology at Inha University
 College of Human Ecology at Seoul National University
 College of Human Ecology at Shih-Chien University
 College of Human Ecology at University of the Philippines, Los Baños
 College of Human Ecology at Yonsei University

United States
 Cornell University College of Human Ecology at Cornell University
 The College of Human Ecology at East Carolina University at East Carolina University
 College of Human Ecology at Kansas State University
 College of Human Ecology at Michigan State University
 College of Human Ecology at the University of Minnesota
 College of Human Ecology at the Ohio State University

See also
 School of Human Ecology at the University of Wisconsin